Pea Ridge is a census-designated place in Shelby County, Alabama, United States. The community is named for Pea Ridge, the broadest ridge in the Cahaba Coal Field. This ridge divides the waters of the Cahaba River and Little Cahaba River. Pea Ridge has maintained a volunteer fire department since 1972.

It was first named as a CDP in the 2020 Census which listed a population of 841.

Demographics

2020 census

Note: the US Census treats Hispanic/Latino as an ethnic category. This table excludes Latinos from the racial categories and assigns them to a separate category. Hispanics/Latinos can be of any race.

References

Census-designated places in Shelby County, Alabama
Census-designated places in Alabama